Fritz Fliegel (30 November 1907 – 18 July 1941) was a German track cyclist, Luftwaffe bomber pilot and recipient of the Knight's Cross of the Iron Cross, the highest award in the military and paramilitary forces of Nazi Germany during World War II. On 18 July 1941, Fiegel was killed in action flying a Focke-Wulf Fw 200 during the Atlantic War in an attack on convoy OB 346. He targeted the 7,046-ton freighter Pilar de Larrinaga. However, the gunners shot his starboard wing off and he crashed into the sea, killing all on board.

Early life and career
Fliegel was born on 30 November 1907 in Wilmersdorf, a borough of Berlin, in the Kingdom of Prussia. He was the son of the son of geographer Gotthard Fliegel and his wife Anna Marie, née Meyer. Fliegel, who had three sisters, won his first bicycle race in 1926. In 1929, he won the German amateur sprint championship at the velodrome in Stettin-Westend. That year, he also participated in the UCI Track Cycling World Championships held in Zürich, Switzerland where he lost in the knockout stage to the Austrian August Schaffer.

Fliegel joined the military service in 1934 and transferred from the infantry of the Reichsheer (Army) to the newly emerging Luftwaffe (Air Force) of Nazi Germany a year later. Following his flight training, he served as flight instructor at the pilot schools A/B 42 in Salzwedel and A/B 113 in Brünn. There he was promoted to Hauptmann (captain) on 1 March 1939.

World War II
World War II in Europe began on Friday, 1 September 1939, when German forces invaded Poland. Fliegel flew combat missions over Poland and received the Iron Cross 2nd Class on 15 September 1939. In early May 1940 when I. Gruppe (1st group) of Kampfgeschwader 40 (KG 40—40th Bomber Wing), a unit equipped with the long-range Focke-Wulf Fw 200 "Condor" reconnaissance and anti-shipping/maritime patrol bomber aircraft, Fliegel was transferred to the 2. Staffel (2nd squadron) of KG 40. The unit initially operated against enemy shipping from airbases in Denmark. There he was awarded the Iron Cross 1st Class on 13 May 1940.

In mid-1940, I. Gruppe relocated to the airbase Bordeaux-Mérignac at the Atlantic coast near Bordeaux in France. In October 1940, he was appointed Staffelkapitän (squadron leader) of 2. Staffel of KG 40.

Clausen reported the sighting, which was relayed to KG 40 by Fliegerführer Atlantik. U-37 sank three further ships from HG 53. This achievement earned him his first mention in the Wehrmachtbericht, an information bulletin and element of Nazi propaganda issued by the headquarters of the Wehrmacht.

Fliegel was awarded the Knight's Cross of the Iron Cross on 25 March 1941. In mid-April 1941 he was appointed Gruppenkommandeur (group commander) of I. Gruppe of KG 40, replacing Major Edgar Petersen. He was mentioned a second time in the Wehrmachtbericht on 20 June 1941 after the number of enemy shipping destroyed by his Gruppe increased by a further 24 ships, reaching 109 enemy ships sunk. By early 1941 I. Gruppe of KG 40 had five holders of the Knight's Cross of the Iron Cross reflecting the success of the Condors in Atlantic Ocean operations.

Killed in action
On 18 July 1941, Fliegel and his crew—copilot Leutnant (Second Lieutenant) Wolf-Dietrich Kadelke, first radio operator Oberfeldwebel (Staff Sergeant) Johannes Rottke, second radio operator Gefreiter (Airman) Karl Becker, flight engineer Unteroffizier (Sergeant) Johann Kothe and air gunner Unteroffizier Karl Meurer—were reported missing in action over the Atlantic in the vicinity northwest of Ireland. Their Fw 200 C-3 "F8+AB" (Werknummer 0043—factory number) was shot down in an attack on convoy OB 346. During the attack on the freighter Pilar de Larrinaga, the gunners on board the freighter scored a hit on the Fw 200's starboard wing which tore it off. At the time of his death, Fliegel was credited with seven ships sunk plus further six damaged. He was promoted to Major (major) posthumously.

Awards
 Iron Cross (1939)
 2nd Class (15 September 1939)
 1st Class (13 May 1940)
 Knight's Cross of the Iron Cross on 25 March 1941 as Hauptmann and Gruppenkommandeur of the I./Kampfgeschwader 40
 Two named references in the Wehrmachtbericht (10 February 1941 and 20 June 1941)

Notes

References

Citations

Bibliography

External links
 

1907 births
1941 deaths
Cyclists from Berlin
German track cyclists
German male cyclists
German World War II pilots
Recipients of the Knight's Cross of the Iron Cross
Luftwaffe personnel killed in World War II
People lost at sea
Military personnel from Berlin
People from Wilmersdorf
Reichswehr personnel